Pagination is the process of dividing information (content) into discrete pages, either electronic pages or printed pages.

Pagination may also refer to:
Bekker pagination, a system of reference and organization used in modern editions and translations of Aristotle
Kühn pagination, a system of reference and organization used in modern editions and translations of Galen
Stephanus pagination, a system of reference and organization used in modern editions and translations of Plato
Paging, a computer memory management scheme

See also 
 Page (disambiguation)